Chadiza is a town in the Eastern Province of Zambia. Its headquarters are located at Chadiza District. It lies 35 km south of the Great East Road and about 80 km south-south-west of Chipata, on a plateau (elevation 1050 m) studded by isolated rocky hills, between the middle Luangwa valley and the Zambezi. It is also 35 kilometres north-north-east of the Chimefusa Border (the main border crossing between Mozambique and Zambia).

References

Terracarta/International Travel Maps, Vancouver Canada: "Zambia, 2nd edition", 2000

Populated places in Eastern Province, Zambia